Simon Geros is a Samoan former professional rugby league footballer who played in the 1990s, 2000s and 2010s who represented Samoa in the 2000 World Cup.

Playing career
Geros played for the Burleigh Bears when in 2000 he was selected for Samoa in the World Cup. He stayed with the Bears in the 2001 Queensland Cup.

In 2002 he was part of the Northern Eagles franchise and played in the NSWRL Premier League.

He then went on to play for the Valley United Spartans where he played a club record 450 games over 15 seasons.

References

Living people
Samoan rugby league players
Samoa national rugby league team players
Burleigh Bears players
Rugby league five-eighths
Samoan expatriate rugby league players
Expatriate rugby league players in Australia
Samoan expatriate sportspeople in Australia
1975 births